The Assam Administrative Staff College  (AASC ) is a civil service  training institute for Assam Administrative  Service Cadre  on public policy and public administration in Assam and for conducting Civil Service Foundation Programme of other allied civil services in Assam. Operated by India's Government of Assam, AASC is located in the heart of Guwahati, Assam .

Activities of the College 

 Conduct foundation courses for Assam Administrative  Service ,  Assam Police Service, Assam Land and Revenue Service, Assam Finance Service, Superintendent of Taxes, Assistant Manager of Industries , Registrar and other allied  civil services included therein selected after qualifying from Assam Public Service Commission Common Competitive Examination for Government of Assam.
 Conduct training need analysis
 Design training programs
 Prepare, update training materials
 Internally validate the training course to improve training
 Conduct external validation
 Continuously update the methodology of training to make it cost effective
 Adhere to the concept of Systematic Approach to Training
 Conduct foundation courses for State Civil Service Officers and other departmental officials of North-Eastern States
 Conduct orientation and refresher courses in Management, Development Administration, Rural Development, Decentralized Planning Process, Project Formulation, Public Distribution System, computer systems, etc.
 Run several courses annually for Indian Administrative Service and  Indian Police Service other allied services of Government of India
 Conduct courses sponsored by Government of India on Training of Trainers, Management of Training, Human Rights, Gender Issues, Hospital Administration, Computer Application etc.

References 

Public administration schools in India
State agencies of Assam